Kimberly Willis Holt is an American writer of children's literature. She is best known for the novel When Zachary Beaver Came to Town, which won the 1999 U.S. National Book Award for Young People's Literature.
It was adapted as a 2003 film of the same name.

Books
 My Louisiana Sky (Henry Holt and Co., 1998)
 Mister and Me (Puffin, 1998)
 When Zachary Beaver Came to Town (Holt, 1999)
 Dancing in Cadillac Light (Holt, 2001)
 Keeper of the Night (Holt, 2003)
 Part of Me (Holt, 2006)
 The Water Seeker (Holt, 2010)
 Dear Hank Williams (Holt, 2015)
Blooming at the Texas Sunrise Motel (Holt, 2017)
The Lost Boy's Gift (Holt, 2019)
The Ambassador of Nowhere, Texas (Holt, 2021)

Piper Reed chapter books
 Piper Reed, Navy Brat (Holt, 2007)
 Piper Reed, The Great Gypsy (Holt, 2008)
 Piper Reed Gets a Job (Holt, 2009)
 Piper Reed, Campfire Girl (Holt, 2010)
 Piper Reed, Rodeo Star (Holt, 2011)
 Piper Reed, Forever Friend (Holt, 2012)

Picture books
 Waiting for Gregory illustrated by Gabi Swiatkowska (Holt, 2006)
 The Adventures Of Granny Clearwater And Little Critter (Holt, 2007)
 Skinny Brown Dog (Holt, 2007)
 Dinner with the Highbrows, illustrated by Kyrsten Brooker (Henry Holt and Co., 2014)

Awards
 When Zachary Beaver Came to Town, 1999, National Book Award for Young People's Literature

References

External links
 
 Kimberly Willis Holt at Scholastic Teachers — with linked online interview by schoolchildren
 Kimberly Willis Holt at Random House
2008 Audio Interview
 

Year of birth missing (living people)
Living people
American children's writers
People from Amarillo, Texas
People from Forest Hill, Louisiana
Writers from Texas
Writers from Louisiana
National Book Award for Young People's Literature winners
American women children's writers
John Ehret High School alumni
People from Pensacola, Florida
21st-century American women